Milton Makasini Ngauamo (born 25 May 1976 in Auckland) is a New Zealand-born Tongan former rugby union player. He played as a lock. He is the brother of Johnny Ngauamo, who is also a rugby union player.

Career
Ngauamo debuted for Tonga during a match against Papua New Guinea on 30 November 2002, in Port Moresby. He was also part of the 2003 Rugby World Cup Tonga squad, playing four matches in the tournament. Although not being called up for the 2007 Rugby World Cup squad, Ngauamo still played at international level for Tonga, with his last international test cap being against Fiji on 5 July 2008, in Nuku'alofa. At club level he played the National Provincial Championship for Auckland and Wellington and for the Hurricanes in the Super 14, to then play in Europe for Calvisano and for Lyon OU. Ngauamo also played in 1997 for the New Zealand Colts.

References

External links
Milton Makasini Ngauamo at New Zealand Rugby History
Milton Ngauamo international statistics at ESPN Scrum
Milton Ngauamo Itsrugby.fr
Milton Ngauamo European statistics

1976 births
Living people
Rugby union players from Auckland
Tonga international rugby union players
Tongan rugby union players
Expatriate rugby union players in France
Expatriate rugby union players in Italy
Rugby union locks